Australonyx is an extinct genus of ground sloths, endemic to South America during the Late Pleistocene. It was found in Brazil.

Discovery 
The holotype specimen was recovered from Poço Azul, an underwater cave system in Nova Redenção, Bahia state. (The same cave also yielded remains of another extinct sloth species, Ahytherium.) The specimen was well preserved, consisting of both the front and back half of the skull (but missing the midsection), the mandible, most of the spine, and some elements from the limbs. Additionally, a nearly identical almost complete skull from Rondônia can be referred to this species.

References 

Prehistoric sloths
Pleistocene xenarthrans
Prehistoric placental genera
Holocene extinctions
Pleistocene mammals of South America
Lujanian
Pleistocene Brazil
Fossils of Brazil
Fossil taxa described in 2009